The 2018 World Series of Darts was a series of televised darts tournaments organised by the Professional Darts Corporation. In 2018, there were 6 World Series events and one finals event, which has this year been moved from Glasgow, Scotland to Vienna, Austria.

Prize money

International events

Final

World Series events

World Series qualifiers

German Masters
  Max Hopp
  Martin Schindler
  Nico Kurz
  Manfred Bilderl
  Gabriel Clemens
  Stefan Stoyke
  Dragutin Horvat
  Robert Marijanović

US Masters
  Dawson Murschell
  Joe Huffman
  John Norman Jnr
  DJ Sayre
  Ross Snook
  David Cameron
  Dan Lauby Jr
  Jeff Smith

Shanghai Masters
  Lourence Ilagan
  Seigo Asada
  Royden Lam
  Zong Xiao Chen
  Liu Cheng An
  Hai Long Chen
  Lihao Wen
  Yuanjun Liu

Auckland Masters
  Cody Harris
  Warren Parry
  Tim Pusey
  Haupai Puha
  Ben Robb
  John Hurring
  Tahuna Irwin
  Mark McGrath

Melbourne Masters
  Corey Cadby
  Raymond Smith
  Tim Pusey
  Haupai Puha
  Damon Heta
  Mike Bonser 
  Raymond O'Donnell
  James Bailey

Brisbane Masters
  Corey Cadby
  Raymond Smith
  Tim Pusey
  Mark Cleaver
  Damon Heta
  Gordon Mathers
  Barry Gardner
  Justin Thompson

2018 World Series Order of Merit
The top eight qualified (highlighted in green) for the World Series of Darts Finals and determined their seeding. The next 8 players qualified (highlighted in cyan) for the tournament, but were unseeded. The players highlighted in yellow qualified by the PDC Order of Merit. (The players who aren't highlighted either withdrew or couldn't make the Finals as late call-ups.)

References

World Series of Darts